G-Worldwide Entertainment (G.W.W.) is a 360 Entertainment Company in Nigeria, founded by Festus "Emperor Geezy" Ehimare. The company operates as a music and movie production company in Lagos. Its services include music recording, distribution, music publishing, and film production. Its label is home to recording acts, such as Sugarboy, Ajura, and Easy Jay, and home to recording music producers Hollar (Da beat cheat), and Brickz. Artists formerly signed, include Kiss Daniel, Iceberg Slim, and DJ Shabsy.

History
G-Worldwide Entertainment was founded in 2007 by Emperor Geezy (born Festus Ehimare) and began promoting musical talents in 2011. In 2013, the music company rebranded and began operating as a record label, with the signing of its first act Kiss Daniel. Under the label, Kiss Daniel, now Kizz Daniel released numerous hit singles including "Woju", "Laye" and "Mama". On 14 May 2016, Kiss Daniel released his first studio album New Era, under the label. The album peaked at number eight on the Billboard World Album, Week of June 4, 2016. On 22 April 2017, Sugarboy released his first studio album Believe On 27 April 2018, G-Worldwide signed Ajura, and Easy Jay. 

On 14 March 2021, G-Worldwide announce its first movie Suga Suga, produced by Louiza Williams, and starring Ayo Adesanya, Tana Adelana, Wole Ojo, and Charles Inojie. On 16 May 2022, the film was made available for online streaming to over 200+ countries, including the United States, United Kingdom, and Germany, through Amazon Prime Video.

Departures

Kiss Daniel
On 13 November 2017, Kiss Daniel exist the label. On 30 November 2017, the court grant an order, for both parties to maintain the status quo pertaining to the contract that was initially signed in 2013. On 6 December 2017, GWW lawyer, Calmhill Partners issued a statement to The Punch, about the judge's decision and disclose the order signed by Hon. Justice Babs O. Kuewumi, in his statement. On 15 December 2017, Lagos High Court ordered Kiss Daniel to appear back in court within 30 days of receiving the court papers.

On 10 March 2018, Kiss Daniel reportedly won the court case against G-Worldwide. A week, after the announcement of his victory, on 17 March, G-Worldwide representative, Louisa, said that the report of his victory, is totally false as the case had only been adjourned until May. On 15 June 2018, G-Worldwide breaks silent, filed a new application which was granted by the court, to claim ownership of both trademarks (Kiss Daniel or his new stage name Kizz Daniel). On 19 October 2019, Kizz Daniel was sued for 500 million naira.

On 26 October 2019, Pulse Nigeria released the documents obtained on Friday, October 25, 2019, that contains Kizz Daniel's reply, as represented and signed by Oluwaseye I. Lawal (Esq.). In the 8-point document, Pulse Nigeria author Motolani Alake reviews the documents, in which Kizz Daniel denies that a new lawsuit was instituted against him by G Worldwide, and gives Kizz Daniel all right to continue using both stage names "Kizz Daniel/Kiss Daniel" and perform all records, produced and released under G-Worldwide.

On 13 December 2019, Agbakoba informed members of the press that the Nigerian singer, will not perform on 26 December 2019, at his concert. Olisa Agbakoba reason is that the artist's 'brand' still belongs to G-Worldwide Entertainment. At the press conference, he said his client wants to make an example of Kizz Daniel to artists who breach the terms of their record contracts. "We are going to apply for an injunction to stop the show because he is tied to us and the matter is in court and if it is in court, the court has to decide", he said.

Accolades
On 13 December 2016, G-Worldwide Entertainment was shortlisted among the nominees in the Best Record Label category at the 2nd edition of The Beatz Awards.

Roster

Current acts

Former acts

Current producers
Hollar (Da beat cheat)
Brickz

Discography

Albums & EPs

Singles

Film productions

References

Record labels established in 2007
Film studios
Nigerian record labels
Film production companies of Nigeria
Nigerian film studios
Companies based in Lagos
Entertainment companies of Nigeria
Entertainment companies established in 2007
Film organizations in Nigeria
Record labels established in the 2000s